Kui Ren is an engineer at the State University of New York, Buffalo. He was named a Fellow of the Institute of Electrical and Electronics Engineers (IEEE) in 2016 for his contributions to security and privacy in cloud computing and wireless networks.

References 

Fellow Members of the IEEE
Living people
Year of birth missing (living people)
University at Buffalo faculty
Place of birth missing (living people)
American electrical engineers